Antoine Eito (born April 6, 1988) is a French professional basketball player for Élan Chalon of the LNB Pro B.

On May 31, 2013, he returned to Le Mans for two seasons.

On May 6, 2014, he was a substitute for the list of sixteen pre-selected players for the France A team to tour China and Italy in June.

On June 9, 2015, he returned to Orléans where he signed a two-year contract.

On June 26, 2021, he has signed with Élan Chalon of the Pro B.

3x3 career
As part of Team Paris, Eito won the 2020 French Championship alongside teammates Angelo Tsagarakis, Léopold Cavalière and Johan Passave-Ducteil.

References

1988 births
Living people
ASVEL Basket players
Élan Chalon players
French men's basketball players
JA Vichy players
Le Mans Sarthe Basket players
Orléans Loiret Basket players
Point guards
Sportspeople from Charente